Sozita Goudouna (Greek: Σωζήτα Γκουντούνα is a curator, professor
 and the author of Beckett's Breath: Anti-theatricality and the Visual Arts on Samuel Beckett's Breath, one of the shortest plays ever written for the theatre, published by Edinburgh University Press and released in the US by Oxford University Press. According to William Hutchings' review at the Comparative Drama Conference Series 15, Goudouna's book is surely the most ever said about the least in the entire history of literary criticism. In 2022 Goudouna initiated and teaches the MA on Breath Studies: Breath in the Visual and Performing Arts at Goldsmiths, University of London. 

Goudouna was selected as the inaugural Andrew W. Mellon Foundation curator at Performa (performance festival) in New York City founded by Roselee Goldberg. Goudouna served as the director of the first European funded Art Residency and as the Visual Art Consultant of the Onassis Foundation Festival in New York. She curated a project with Paul B. Preciado with the participation of Karen Finley at the Parliament of Bodies public arts program at Documenta 14 and in 2019 she joined as head of operations  Raymond Pettibon Studio. In 2020 Goudouna founded the NYC non for profit organization GREECE IN USA with an international board of professionals for the internalization of contemporary Greek art that featured 150 Greek artists. In this context she conceived the arts platform "ArtPort" in collaboration with the Piraeus Municipal Theatre for the promotion of international art in Greece that first presented Andres Serrano,John Akomfrah's video installation "The Airport" in Athens in 2021 and Arthur Jafa’s Love is the message, the message is death. In July 2022 she established the Opening Art Initiative  in Tribeca New York as a non profit cultural venue that donates proceeds to a charity dedicated to neurodiversity. The gallery has presented artists Kenneth Goldsmith, John Zorn, Warren Neidich, Coleman Collins, Constance DeJong, Charles Gaines, Jimmie Durham, Leslie Hewitt, Jimmy Raskin, Agnieszka Kurant, Olu Oguibe, Martha Rosler, Allen Ruppersberg, Chrysanne Stathacos among others. In 2022 she was the winner of the British Council Culture and Creativity UK Study Award.

Education 
Goudouna moved to London in 1996 where she settled until 2012. She received her BA (Hons) in Philosophy with Theatre from London Metropolitan University and holds a Master of Arts (MA) in Text, Performance and Directing from Royal Academy of Dramatic Art and in English Literature from Kings College, University of London.
She holds a PhD from the University of London on high modernist theory focusing on Michael Fried and the work of Samuel Beckett supervised by David Bradby. Goudouna received a scholarship in 2002 from the Alexander S. Onassis Foundation Public Benefit Foundation to pursue her PhD research.

Early life 
Goudouna was born in Athens, Greece. When she was 15 she co-organised, with a collective of five friends, the first renowned concert in Greece in support of ACT UP at the old brewery of FIX with the participation of school bands and of popular alternative bands including  Groove Machine, Make Believe and Honey Dive.
Goudouna first gained art world attention in 2000, when she directed for RADA a performance and visual art project in a listed house at Duke st in London, in collaboration with dancers from The Place based on Ritter, Dene, Voss by Thomas Bernhardt. The site specific project at Duke st and The Place, London alluded to Haus Wittgenstein's modernist house in Vienna.

Beckett's Breath 
Goudouna's book Beckett's Breath: Antitheatricality and the Visual Arts was published by Edinburgh University Press in 2018 and released in the US by Oxford University Press.
Samuel Beckett wrote Breath (play), a thirty-second playlet for the stage that does not include actors, text, characters or drama but only stage directions. Goudouna's monograph analyses the ways the piece became emblematic of the intermedia exchanges that occur in Beckett's later writings, as well as the cross-fertilisation of the theatre with the visual arts. The book examines Beckett's ultimate venture to define the borders between a theatrical performance and purely visual representation and juxtaposes Beckett's Breath (play) with breath-related artworks by visual artists including Valie Export, Feminist Art Workers, Marcel Duchamp, Piero Manzoni, Gerhard Richter, Bridget Riley, Giuseppe Penone, John Latham, Vito Acconci, Chris Burden, Nancy Spero, Lygia Clark, Art & Language, Marina Abramović.

Performa Biennial (New Visual Performance Festival) 
Goudouna was selected in May 2015 as the first Andrew W. Mellon Foundation curatorial fellow at Performa. In 2005 Performa (performance festival) hosted the first Performa Biennial, a series of performance events at venues and institutions across New York City by its founding curator and editor Roselee Goldberg. For the 2005 Biennial the Solomon R. Guggenheim presented Marina Abramović's Seven Easy Pieces, in which Abramović re-performed several works from the canon of early performance works, including two of her own. Performances included works by Gina Pane, Vito Acconci, Valie Export, Bruce Nauman, Noni Gevillea and Joseph Beuys.
For Performa15, that celebrated ten years since the founding of the Performa biennial in 2005, Goudouna worked for the production of new commissions by artists Yvonne Rainer, Tania Bruguera, Francesco Vezzoli, David Hallberg, Juliana Huxtable, Robin Rhode, Laura Lima, Heather Phillipson, Chimurenga, Edgar Arceneaux, Erika Vogt and Performa alums Jérôme Bel, Jesper Just among others. During Goudouna's post in 2015, Performa announced a new partnership with the Paris-based arts organisation Lafayette Anticipation, Fondation Galeries Lafayette. For Performa, Goudouna initiated the commissions from Performa Archives among other initiatives.

Raymond Roussel Society 
Goudouna curated a production on Raymond Roussel's Locus Solus that was presented from 2009 until 2010 as a location driven project in Shunt Vaults Shunt (theatre company) London Bridge, the Byzantine and Christian Museum and the Benaki Museum, as well as in public spaces in Elephant and Castle. For this project Goudouna collaborated with Werner Nekes, Mat Collishaw, Flux Factory NYC, The International Institute for Important Items and more than 100 artists and architects.
Owing to Goudouna's extensive research on Roussel she was invited to participate in the tribute to John Ashbery.Raymond Roussel Society consists of a special team of creators, thinkers and artists who were profoundly affected by Roussel. The Raymond Roussel Society honoured John Ashbery with the Raymond Roussel Society Medal in June 2017 in New York.

Ecological activities 
Sozita Goudouna has been widely involved in ecological Activism. She ran for the municipal elections of the island of Hydra in 2010 as a member of the Ecological Association of Hydra.
Since 1988 she is a member of the association which was founded in 1988 in Hydra (island) with the aim to protect the environment and Greek cultural heritage within the broad areas of archaeology, traditional settlements and submarine antiquities in Hydra (island) and Dokos
.

The range of the Association's activities covers the protection of natural reserves, protected species and most notably the Mediterranean monk seal "Monachus-Monachus" Mediterranean monk seal which lives and reproduces in the Myrtoan Sea and the eastern part of the Peloponnese. The ecological association has received support from Stavros Niarchos Foundation.
In 2002 she became a board member of the association. As a board member she co-organised projects in collaboration with the Zoology Department at the University of Athens, the University of the Aegean, the Ministry of Environment, Energy & Climate Change, the European Union and other organisations including WWF World Wide Fund for Nature and mother Society for the Study and Protection of the Mediterranean Monk Seal. The projects that she is actively involved include the following:

The Association's protection of the traditional settlements and the archaeological heritage have led to six executive decrees for the benefit of Hydra, including the 1993 the transference of jurisdictions from the Ministry of Environment, Energy & Climate Change and the Ministry of the Aegean Sea to the Ministry of Culture. In 1994 the ancient island of "Aperopia" Dokos known today as "Dokos" was proclaimed as "Non-building Zone A" and the sea around Dokos an archaeological park. In 1996, Hydra was declared an archaeological space and every settlement of the island was held under the auspices of the state. In 1998, the department of Byzantine and post-Byzantine Monuments resulted in the placing of signs/epigraphs in Hydra under particular specifications. In 2002, the association resolved the issue of the ban of vehicles in Hydra with the publication of a joint Ministerial decree regarding the circulation of vehicles in the island. The Association is organising events with institutions including the "Hellenic Society for the Protection of the Environment and the Cultural Heritage," the Goulandris Natural History Museum, the Benaki Museum, the National Gallery, the Byzantine Museum and National Television ERT where Goudouna presented a show on Art and Upcycling

Bibliography
 2018 Beckett's Breath: Antitheatricality and the Visual Arts Edinburgh University Press  
 Space, Kenji Aoki, Monograph, Kehrer Verlag in English and German.

Articles

 2022 Changing Perspectives on Performance Collaboration: Problematizing More-Than-Human Subjectivities A Ambayec, R Gaspar, S Goudouna, JT Kühling, S Probst,
 2021 Theatre Essentials in Three Acts: Collaboration, Care, Time by Shawn Chua, Sozita Goudouna, Adham Hafez, Eero Laine, Sarah Lucie, Juliana Moraes, Malin Palani, Rumen Rachev, and Leah Sidi, editor John Fletcher, Special Issue on Essentials, Theatre Topics, Volume 31, Number 2, July 2021, pp. ix-xii (Article)Published by Johns Hopkins University Press
 2021 The Impossible Spectator A collective essay by Renata Gaspar, Sozita Goudouna, Nilüfer Ovalıoğlu Gros, Jan-Tage Kühling, Eero Laine, Sarah Lucie, Juliana Moraes, Evan Moritz, Malin Palani, Kristof van Baarle, E-tcetera Magazine
 2020 Théâtre/Public Journal: Special Issue on Theatre and the Visual Arts | Interview with RoseLee Goldberg ~ Performa (performance festival)
 2018 Mat Chivers in Horea Avram (ed) Moving Images, Mobile Bodies. The Poetics and Practice of (Techno-) Corporeality in Performing and Visual Arts Edited by Horea Avram. Newcastle upon Tyne: Cambridge Scholars Publishing, Amsterdam University Press, 2018. 
 2017 Theatricality and Non-Art in Theatricality and Theory. Topika ib Nissos Publications  
 2016 Eco-Specificity: Performing the Heterogeneous Centre of The Ecological Imperative Written
 2016 Personhood and the Allure of the Object in Critical Issues: The Visual in Performance Practice. Oxford, England, Interdisciplinary Press, 2010 
 2014 Contemplating Inactivity in Joo Yeon Park, Echo of Echo in English & Korean, Translation Sunghee Lee, Joseph Fungsang (Essays) Doryun Chong (Interview)  Seoul: DOOSAN Gallery and Mediabus, 2014 
 2014 Sozita Goudouna (2014) Contemporary Greek Art: Impoverishment of Means Versus Abundance of Intentions, Journal of Poverty, 18:1, 82–102, DOI: 10.1080/10875549.2013.866801
 2014 Marina Abramovic's Seven Deaths: Antiquity as a performing space in DRAMATIC ARCHITECTURES places of drama – drama for places Edition:Centro de Estudos Arnaldo Araújo CESAP/ESAP 
 2014 Locus solus: Towards the Attributes of a New Artistic "Genre", par Sozita GOUDOUNA in ROUSSEL : HIER, AUJOURD'HUI, CARACTÉRISTIQUES, Direction : Pierre Bazantay, Christelle Reggiani, Hermes Salceda, Editeur : Presses Universitaires de Rennes (site internet), Collection, Interférences,  Année de publication : 2014.
 2012 Eleventh Plateau in Amber'11 Sanat ve Teknoloji Festivali / amber'11 Art and Technology Festival BIS, Body-Process Art Association 
 2010 Locus Solus. The International Journal of the Arts in Society: Annual Review 4 (5): 465-482. doi:10.18848/1833-1866/CGP/v04i05/35754.
 2008 Mediated Breath. The International Journal of the Arts in Society: Annual Review 3 (3): 115-130. doi:10.18848/1833-1866/CGP/v03i03/35492.
 2008 Critical Intersections: Education and the Expanding Site of Art Practice.The International Journal of the Arts in Society: Annual Review 2 (4): 41-46. doi:10.18848/1833-1866/CGP/v02i04/35413.

Filmography
 2016 Documentary Dogs of Democracy directed by Mary Zournazi
 2017 TV Series On Upcycling

Exhibitions

 2023   Wet Conceptualism Group Exhibition curated with Warren Neidich Coleman Collins Constance DeJong Charles Gaines Jimmie Durham Leslie Hewitt Jimmy Raskin Agnieszka Kurant Olu Oguibe Martha Rosler Allen Ruppersberg Chrysanne Stathacos at The Opening Gallery, 42 Walker st, December - February 2021, New York
 2022   Arthur Jafa Solo Exhibition, Artport Festival, Municipality of Piraeus, Municipal Theater of Pireaus. 
 2021   John Akomfrah The Airport video installation  at Piraeus Municipal Theatre 2021   Andres Serrano solo exhibition at Piraeus Municipal Theatre 2021   Cameron Jamie at The Journal Gallery in New York 2021  The Right To Breathe at Undercurrent.nyc
 2021  The Right To Silence? at Anya and Andrew Shiva Art Gallery CUNY
 2020 Raymond Pettibon and the Soft Clay of Our Generation 
 2019 Raymond Pettibon, Whoever Shows: Strike Uyp th’ Band! at the New Museum Co-presentation with Performa (performance festival) Performa 19 Biennial, produced by Sozita Goudouna 2019 OUT SCORE at Aexone, Onassis Foundation and Onassis Scholars production, Group Exhibition with the participation of artists: Maria Hassabi, Kelly Nipper, Michael Portnoy, Duke Riley, Alexandros Georgiou, Delia Gonzalez, Eleni Kamma, Kostis Velonis, Raymond Pettibon, Erlea Maneros Zabala, Ilan Manouach, Christian Wassmann, Vassilis Salpistis and Marie Voignier, Dionysis Kavalieratos, Maria Georgoula, Nikos Charalambidis, Olga Venetsianou, Angela Svoronou, Sotiris Karamanis and Mark Aerial Waller. 2019 Kenji Aoki solo show, Warren st New York.  2019 UN/FASHION Group Exhibition at Megaron Athens Concert Hall for the 1st Athens Fashion Film Festival initially launched in Milan by Constanza Cavalli Etro. 2018 Trajal Harrell at Dystopian Pleasures by FYTA & the Ministry of Post Truth.  Athens School of Fine Arts
 2018 SHADOW LIBRARIES: UBUWEB Top Tens Exhibition, 24h Ubu  Onassis Cultural Centre
 2018 Theorems, AICA International Art Critics Association Annual Exhibition EMST National Contemporary Art Museum
 2017 Documenta 14 International Exhibition Oracle Drawings Parliament of Bodies, Parko Eleftherias
 2017 COMBAT BREATHING, Participating Artists: Valie Export, John Latham, Jesper Just, Kelly Nipper, Karen Finley, Liz Magic Laser, Nikos Navridis, Jenny Marketou, Peggy Kliafa EMST National Contemporary Art Museum
 2017 A CERTAIN BLUE OF THE SEA, 40 Artists Group Exhibition Ionian Parliament
 2016 ANTIGONE NOW Festival   Onassis Foundation New York
 2016 COMMONPLACE General Consulate of Greece in New York
 2016 Navine G. Khan-Dossos Solo Booth Project  Art-Athina International Art Fair
 2016 Joo Yeon Park, O Solo Exhibition & Performance 1st Official European Union Athens Art Residency
 2015 Performa 15 New York Biennial MoMA, Times Square, Marian Goodman Gallery, Brooklyn Academy of Music, Martha Graham Studio Theater, PARTICIPANT INC, Swiss Institute Contemporary Art New York (SI), Roulette, Rhizome, Jewish Museum, Goethe Institute New York, Danspace Project, El Museo del Barrio, Printed Matter Inc
 2015 Pavel Büchler Solo Booth Project 2015 Roy Ascott, The Art of Technoetics: A Syncretic Strategy. The I-Node Of The Planetary Collegium University of Plymouth 1st Official European Union Athens Art Residency
 2015 Martin Creed, Like Water at a Buffet.Solo Exhibition & Performance 1st Official European Union Athens Art Residency
 2015 Andrea Geyer Comrades of Time.Gilles Deleuze and Felix Guattari: Refrains of Freedom International Conference  Museum of History University of Athens
 2015 Lynda Benglis Solo Exhibition 1st Official European Union Athens Art Residency
 2015 Santiago Sierra. Stray Dogs Project.Solo Exhibition and public intervention Syntagma Square
 2014 Tim Shaw RA Time Got Knicked Around Solo Exhibition  1st Official European Union Athens Art Residency
 2014 Traces of Truth and Circles of Deceit: Beirut Entangled.Beirut: Bodies in Public Project.Public Intervention Martyrs' Square, Beirut
 2014 Marie Voignier, One by One Solo Exhibition  1st Official European Union Athens Art Residency
 2014 Miriam Simun, Three Rituals for the Eco-city.Solo Exhibition and Public Art Project  1st Official European Union Athens Art Residency
 2014 Andrea Geyer. Three Chants Modern, commissioned by The Museum of Modern Art, New York. Made possible by MoMA's Wallis Annenberg Fund for Innovation in Contemporary Art through the Annenberg Foundation.Solo Booth Project  Art-Athina International Art Fair
 2013 Mat Chivers.Between the Night and the Day and the Day and Night.Intervention in the public sphere Monastiraki Square
 2013 Mat Chivers.Between the Night and the Day and the Day and Night.Intervention in the public sphere 1st Official European Union Athens Art Residency
 2013 RAQS MEDIA COLLECTIVE.Accumulation .Solo booth project  Art-Athina International Art Fair
 2013 The Metaphor of The Blind, in conjunction with Jacques Derrida ConferenceFrench Institute
 2012 "Metabolism of Forms.Solo Exhibition & Performance" Hunterian Museum (London)
 2012 "Un-Inhabited" Archeological Museum, Island of Delos
 2012 Words! Words! Words! Lettrism International Festival Beton Arts
 2012 Time to Open the Black Boxes By Danae Stratou Zoumboulakis Galleries
 2011 Eleventh Plateau Archeological Association Athens
 2011 Eleventh Plateau Historical Archives Museum Hydra
 2010 Locus Solus Benaki Museum
 2010 Locus Solus Byzantine Museum
 2009 Spaces Within Spaces Festival London Festival of Europe

Editorial activities
 2018 JAR Journal of Artistic Research, associate editor
 2017 Journal of Poverty, publisher Routledge, associate editor
 2016  Deucalion Philosophical Journal, associate editor
 2011  STP: Studies in Theatre and Performance Intellect Publishers, associate editor, publisher Routledge
 2009  Arts in Society Journal CommonGround Publishers associate editor
 2009  Naked But Safe'', art editor

References

Writers from Athens
Greek art curators
Women art historians
Alumni of the University of London
Alumni of RADA
Living people
Year of birth missing (living people)
Greek women curators